Two Knights of Vaudeville is an American 1915 short comedy film with an African American cast. Luther Pollard produced and Ebony Film Corporation distributed the film. Jimmy Marshall, Frank Montgomery, and Florence McClain star in the film. A vaudeville spoof, it is preserved at the Library of Congress.

See also
African American cinema

References

1915 films
1915 short films
American short films